Robert Alexander Morrell (born May 11, 1994) is an American soccer player who plays as a winger.

Career
Morell spent four years playing in the collegiate ranks for the North Florida Ospreys, while also playing for VSI Tampa Bay and Orlando City B in the Premier Development League, and amateur development league for college players. After graduating college, Morrell was drafted as the 22nd overall pick in the 2016 MLS SuperDraft by Chicago Fire. He signed with the club on March 11, 2016. During the 2016 season, Morrell made four appearances with the Fire before being loaned for the remainder of the season to Saint Louis FC. Morrell made two appearances for Saint Louis. After Fire did not extend his 2017 contract option, Morrell signed with Tampa Bay Rowdies on December 29, 2016. In his first season with the Rowdies Morrell played in 23 matches and scored 2 goals. In 2018, Morrell made a further 11 appearances with the Rowdies, but the team declined to resign him.

Morrell joined Tormenta FC ahead of the inaugural USL League One season.

In January 2020, Morrell signed with Greenville Triumph SC.

Career statistics

References

External links 
 
 

1994 births
Living people
American soccer players
Association football midfielders
Chicago Fire FC draft picks
Chicago Fire FC players
Major League Soccer players
North Florida Ospreys men's soccer players
Saint Louis FC players
Soccer players from Florida
Sportspeople from Lakeland, Florida
Tampa Bay Rowdies players
Tormenta FC players
USL Championship players
USL League One players
USL League Two players
VSI Tampa Bay FC (PDL) players
Greenville Triumph SC players